H5N1 clinical trials are clinical trials concerning H5N1 vaccines, which are intended to provide immunization to influenza A virus subtype H5N1. They are intended to discover pharmacological effects and identify any adverse reactions the vaccines may achieve in humans.

Current status of H5N1 candidate vaccines
Candidate vaccines were developed in the United States and the United Kingdom during 2003 for protection against the strain that was isolated from humans in Hong Kong in February 2003 but the 2003 strain died out in 2004 making the vaccine of little use. In April 2004, WHO made an H5N1 prototype seed strain available to manufacturers. In August 2006, WHO changed the prototype strains and now offers three new prototype strains which represent three of the six subclades of the clade 2 virus which have been responsible for many of the human cases that have occurred since 2005.

The National Institute of Allergy and Infectious Diseases (NIAID) awarded H5N1 vaccine contracts to Aventis Pasteur (now Sanofi Pasteur) of Swiftwater, Pennsylvania, and to Chiron Corporation of Emeryville, California. Each manufacturer is using established techniques in which the virus is grown in eggs and then inactivated and further purified before being formulated into vaccines.

"A universal influenza vaccine could provide protection against all types of influenza and would eliminate the need to develop individual vaccines to specific H and N virus types. Such a vaccine would not need to be reengineered each year and could protect against an emergent pandemic strain. Developing a universal vaccine requires that researchers identify conserved regions of the influenza virus that do not exhibit antigenic variability by strain or over time. A universal vaccine, ACAM-FLU-A, is being developed by the British company Acambis and is being researched by others as well. Acambis (meanwhile also acquired by Sanofi Pasteur) announced in early August 2005 that it has had successful results in animal testing. The vaccine focuses on the M2 viral protein, which does not change, rather than the surface hemagglutinin and neuraminidase proteins targeted by traditional flu vaccines. The universal vaccine is made through bacterial fermentation technology, which would greatly speed up the rate of production over that possible with culture in chicken eggs, plus the vaccine could be produced constantly, since its formulation would not change. Still, such a vaccine is years away from full testing, approval, and use." As of July 2007, phase I clinical trials on humans are underway in which a vaccine that focuses on the M2 viral protein "is being administered to a small group of healthy people in order to verify the safety of the product and to provide an initial insight into the vaccine’s effect on the human immune system." (See also Universal flu vaccines) The current development state of ACAM-FLU-A is unclear. 

In June 2006, the National Institutes of Health (NIH) began enrolling participants in a Phase 1 H5N1 study of an intranasal influenza vaccine candidate based on MedImmune's live, attenuated vaccine technology.

Oct 2010 Inovio starts a phase I clinical trial of its H5N1 vaccine (VGX-3400X).

Oct 2012 Novavax, Inc. pandemic influenza vaccine Phase I trials meet primary objectives.

Approved human H5N1 vaccines
On April 17, 2007 the US FDA approved "Influenza Virus Vaccine, H5N1" by manufacturer Sanofi Pasteur Inc for manufacture at its Swiftwater, PA facility.

In March 2006, Hungarian Prime Minister Ferenc Gyurcsány reported that Omninvest developed a vaccine to protect humans against the H5N1 influenza strain. The vaccine was approved by the country's national pharmaceutical institute for commercial production.

Results of trials
Early results from H5N1 clinical trials showed poor immunogenicity compared to the 15-mcg dose that induces immunity in a seasonal flu vaccine. Trials in 2006 and 2007 using two 30-mcg doses produced unacceptable results while a 2006 trial using two doses of 90 mcg each achieved acceptable levels of protection. Current flu vaccine manufacturing plants can not produce enough pandemic flu vaccine at this high dose level.

"Adjuvanted vaccines appear to hold the greatest promise for solving the grave supply-demand imbalance in pandemic influenza vaccine development. They come with obstacles—immunologic, regulatory, and commercial—but they also have generated more excitement than any other type of vaccine thus far. [In August 2007], scientists working with a GlaxoSmithKline formula published a trial of a two-dose regimen of an inactivated split-virus vaccine adjuvanted with a proprietary oil-in-water emulsion; after the second injection, even the lowest dose of 3.8 mcg exceeded EU criteria for immune response (see Bibliography: Leroux-Roels 2007). And in September, Sanofi Pasteur reported in a press release that an inactivated vaccine adjuvanted with the company's own proprietary formula induced EU-accepted levels of protection after two doses of 1.9 mcg."

The "GlaxoSmithKline-backed team that described an acceptable immune response after two adjuvanted 3.8-microgram (mcg) doses found that three fourths of their subjects were protected not only against the clade 1 Vietnam virus on which the vaccine was based, but against a drifted clade 2 virus from Indonesia as well [...] To achieve prepandemic vaccines, researchers would have to ascertain the right dose and dose interval, determine how long priming lasts, and solve the puzzle of measuring primed immunity. Further, regulatory authorities would have to determine the trial design that could deliver those answers, the public discussion that would be necessary for prepandemic vaccines to be accepted, and the safety data that would need to be gathered once the vaccines went into use".

Individual studies

Revaccination - January 2006
Study completion: January 2006

The purpose of this study is to determine whether having received an H5 vaccine in the past primes the immune system to respond rapidly to another dose of H5 vaccine. Subjects who participate in this study will have participated in a previous vaccine study (involving the A/Hong/Kong/97 virus) during the fall of 1998 at the University of Rochester.

A/H5N1 in adult - February 2006
Study start: April 2005;  Study completion: February 2006

The purpose of this study is to determine the dose-related safety of flu vaccine in healthy adults. To determine the dose-related effectiveness of flu vaccine in healthy adults approximately 1 month following receipt of 2 doses of vaccine. To provide information for the selection of the best dose levels for further studies.

H5 booster after two doses - June 2006
Study start: October 2005;  Study completion: June 2006

The purpose of this study is to determine whether a third dose of vaccines containing A/Vietnam/1203/04 provides more immunity than two doses. Subjects who participate in this study, will have participated in DMID protocol 04-063 involving the A/Vietnam/1203/04. In this study, each subject will be asked to receive a third dose of the H5 vaccine at the same level administered in protocol 04-063.

H5 in the elderly - August 2006
Study start: October 2005;  Study completion: August 2006

This study is intended to examine the safety and dose-related immunogenicity of three dosage levels of the Influenza A/H5N1 vaccine, as compared to saline placebo, given intramuscularly to healthy elderly adults approximately 4 weeks apart.

H5 in healthy adults - November 2006
Study start: March 2006;  Expected completion: November 2006

This randomized, controlled, double-blinded, dose-ranging, Phase I-II study in 600 healthy adults, 18 to 49 years old, is designed to investigate the safety, reactogenicity, and dose-related immunogenicity of an investigational inactivated influenza A/H5N1 virus vaccine when given alone or combined with aluminum hydroxide. A secondary goal is to guide selection of vaccine dosage levels for expanded Phase II trials based on reactogenicity and immunogenicity profiles. This dose optimization will be applied to both younger and older subject populations in subsequent studies. Subjects who meet the entry criteria for the study will be enrolled at one of up to 5 study sites and will be randomized into 8 groups to receive two doses of influenza A/H5N1 vaccine containing 3.75, 7.5, 15, or 45 mcg of HA with or without aluminum hydroxide adjuvant by IM injection (N= 60 or 120/vaccine dose group).

Bird flu - November 2006
Study start: March 2006;  Study completion: November 2006

This study is designed to gather critical information on the safety, tolerability, and the immunogenicity (capability of inducing an immune response) of A/H5N1 virus vaccine in healthy adults. Up to 280 healthy adults, aged 18 to 64, will participate in the study. Each subject will participate for 7 months and will be randomly placed in one of several different study groups receiving a different dose of vaccine, vaccine plus adjuvant, or placebo. All subjects will receive two injections of their assigned study product, about 28 days apart, in their muscle tissue. Subjects will keep a journal of their temperature and any adverse effects between study visits. A small amount of blood will also be drawn before the first injection, 7 days after each injection, and 6 months after the second injection.

Pandemic flu - January 2007
Study start: October 2005;  Study completion: January 2007

This Australian study will test the safety and immunogenicity of an H5N1 pandemic influenza vaccine in healthy adults.

Children - February 2007
Study start: January 2006;  Study completion: February 2007

This is a randomized, double-blinded, placebo-controlled, staged, dose-ranging, Phase I/II study to evaluate the safety, reactogenicity, and immunogenicity of 2 doses of an IM inactivated influenza A/H5N1 vaccine in healthy children, aged 2 through 9 years. This study is designed to investigate the safety, tolerability, and dose-related immunogenicity of an investigational inactivated influenza A/H5N1 vaccine. A secondary goal is to identify an optimal dosage level of the vaccine that generates an acceptable immunogenic response, while maintaining an adequate safety profile.

Sources

Further reading
 CIDRAP article NOVAVAX reports good preliminary phase 1 findings for H5N1 vaccine published  Oct 19, 2012
"NOVAVAX, a pharmaceutical company in Rockville, Md., announced this week that in preliminary results of two phase 1 clinical trials, its H5N1 avian influenza vaccine candidate was found to be safe and effective. The company conducted the trials under its contract with the US Biomedical Advanced Research and Development Authority (BARDA). The goal was to test the virus-like particle (VLP) H5N1 vaccine at different dose levels with and without 1 of 2 undisclosed adjuvants. The two trials involved 666 healthy adults who received an intramuscular vaccine or placebo at day 0 and day 21. In findings after the first 42 days, adjuvanted vaccines provoked strong immune responses (seroconverion and seroprotection rates of 86% to 100%) based on hemagglutination inhibition assay (HAI) at all doses tested. The unadjuvanted vaccine at the 45-microgram dose yielded more than 82% seroconversion and seroprotection in both trials. No serious adverse events were observed. The patients who received the adjuvanted vaccines showed signs of protection against a different H5N1 strain. Gregory Glenn, MD, Novavax's senior vice president and chief medical officer, said the results give the company enough data to advance to later-stage testing."
 CIDRAP article Sanofi reports results for H5N1 vaccine with adjuvant published  May 12, 2006
"In a human trial in France, an experimental H5N1 avian influenza vaccine with an adjuvant showed modestly better performance at a lower dose compared with a similar H5N1 vaccine that was tested earlier in the United States. The new study, published in this week’s The Lancet, showed an immune response in 67% of patients receiving two doses of 30 micrograms (mcg) of the vaccine plus an adjuvant. An accompanying commentary, however, pointed out several obstacles that need to be addressed before an effective vaccine can be mass-produced. The vaccine is manufactured by Sanofi Pasteur, a subsidiary of France-based Sanofi Aventis. It is an inactivated, split-virion strain of H5N1 known as Vietnam/1194/2004."
 CIDRAP article Glaxo says its H5N1 vaccine works at low dose published  July 26, 2006
"An H5N1 avian influenza vaccine made by GlaxoSmithKline (GSK) triggered a good immune response in human volunteers at a much lower dose than other H5N1 vaccines reported so far, which means that hundreds of millions of doses could be produced by next year, the company announced today. In a clinical trial, 80% of volunteers who received two vaccine doses containing 3.8 mcg of antigen with an adjuvant (a chemical that stimulates the immune system) had a strong immune response, the British-based company said in a news release. A typical dose of seasonal flu vaccine is 15 mcg. "This is the first time such a low dose of H5N1 vaccine has been able to stimulate this level of strong immune response," GSK Chief Executive Officer J.P. Garnier said in the news release. By comparison, an H5N1 vaccine developed by Sanofi Pasteur induced a good immune response in 67% of volunteers who received two 30-mcg doses with an adjuvant, according to findings reported in May. The US government is stockpiling the Sanofi vaccine. Garnier called the GSK vaccine a breakthrough because, with the effectiveness of the low dose, a given amount of antigen will go much further than it would otherwise. "The meaning of this is that we are going to be in a position, starting later this year, to produce hundreds of millions of doses of an effective pandemic vaccine, so this is a big breakthrough," Garnier said on BBC Radio, as reported today by Agence France-Presse (AFP). The GSK vaccine was made from an inactivated H5N1 virus collected in Vietnam in 2004, according to Jennifer Armstrong, a GSK spokeswoman in Philadelphia."
 CIDRAP article Chinese report results for whole-virus H5N1 vaccine published  September 7, 2006
"In a human trial in China, a whole-virus H5N1 avian influenza vaccine generated an immune response with a relatively low dose of antigen, suggesting that it could be used to immunize more people than may be possible with some other vaccines under development. The study, published online today in The Lancet, showed an adequate immune response in 78% of volunteers after two 10-microgram (mcg) doses of the vaccine plus an aluminum hydroxide (alum) adjuvant. That exceeds the European Union's requirement of an acceptable response (a hemagglutinin-inhibition titer of 40 or more) in 70% of volunteers. The vaccine is made by Sinovac Biotech in Beijing, China, from an inactivated strain of H5N1 known as Vietnam/1194/2004."
 National Institute of Allergy and Infectious Diseases (NIAID) news article NIAID DNA Vaccine for H5N1 Avian Influenza Enters Human Trial published January 2, 2007
"The first human trial of a DNA vaccine designed to prevent H5N1 avian influenza infection began on December 21, 2006, when the vaccine was administered to the first volunteer at the National Institutes of Health (NIH) Clinical Center in Bethesda, MD. Scientists from the Vaccine Research Center (VRC) at the National Institute of Allergy and Infectious Diseases (NIAID), one of the NIH Institutes, designed the vaccine. The vaccine does not contain any infectious material from the influenza virus. Unlike conventional flu vaccines, which are developed by growing the influenza virus in hens' eggs and then administered as a weakened or killed form of the virus, DNA-based vaccines contain only portions of the influenza virus' genetic material. Once inside the body, the DNA instructs human cells to make proteins that act as a vaccine against the virus. VRC Director Gary Nabel, M.D., Ph.D., together with a team of scientists from the VRC recognized the potential for employing new vaccine technology against influenza, a disease for which effective vaccines have long been made, but for which the reliability of supply and manufacturing capacity has been problematic. Dr. Nabel and his colleagues previously have shown the DNA vaccine approach to be effective against influenza viruses in animal models, including highly pathogenic viruses such as the H5N1 strain and the H1N1 virus that caused the deadly 1918 pandemic. The DNA vaccine used in this study is similar to other investigational vaccines evaluated by the VRC that hold promise for controlling other viruses, such as HIV, Ebola, SARS and West Nile. [...] The study will enroll 45 volunteers between the ages of 18 and 60. Fifteen will receive placebo injections and 30 will receive three injections of the investigational vaccine over 2 months and will be followed for 1 year. Volunteers will not be exposed to influenza virus. [...] The candidate vaccine, synthesized using a modified version of the hemagglutinin (H) gene from the H5N1 influenza virus, was manufactured at the VRC Vaccine Pilot Plant. This is the first VRC candidate vaccine manufactured at the VRC Vaccine Pilot Plant. The candidate vaccine went from the research bench into clinical trials in less than 6 months."

Clinical trials
clinical trials